Ruardean Hill is a prominent hill and a village in the English county of Gloucestershire,  west of Gloucester. It lies in the Forest of Dean, in the parish of Drybrook.

The southern slopes are wooded and are part of the northern edge of the Forest of Dean. The hill forms part of a low range of hills separating the River Severn from the River Wye. The hill's summit is the highest point in the Forest of Dean.  A mostly friendly community, there is a local post office and village shop in neighbouring Ruardean Woodside. The village and surrounding areas are well served by Ruardean Hill Sports and Social Club.

Nearest places
 Drybrook
 Steam Mills
 Brierley
 Ruardean Woodside
 Ruardean

External links 

 photos of Ruardean Hill and surrounding area on geograph

Marilyns of England
Hills of Gloucestershire
Villages in Gloucestershire
Forest of Dean